John 20 is the twentieth chapter of the Gospel of John in the New Testament. It relates the story of Jesus' resurrection. It relates how Mary Magdalene went to the tomb of Jesus and found it empty. Jesus appears to her and speaks of his resurrection and dispatches Mary to tell the news to the disciples. Jesus then appears to his disciples. The events related in John 20 are described somewhat differently in Matthew 28, Mark 16, and Luke 24.

The chapter is seemingly the conclusion to the Gospel of John, but it is followed by an apparently "supplementary" chapter, John 21. Some biblical scholars to suggest that John 20 was the original conclusion of the Gospel, and John 21 was a later addition, but there is no conclusive manuscript evidence for this theory.

Text
The original text was written in Koine Greek. This chapter is divided into 31 verses.

Textual witnesses
Some early manuscripts containing the text of this chapter are:
Papyrus 5 (extant verses: 11–17,19-20,22-25)
Codex Vaticanus (AD 325–350)
Codex Sinaiticus (330-360)
Codex Bezae (c. 400)
Codex Alexandrinus (400-440)
Codex Ephraemi Rescriptus (c. 450; extant verses: 26–31)

Analysis

The chapter may be divided into three distinct sections. Verses 1-18 describe events at Jesus' empty tomb when it is found empty and the appearance of the risen Jesus to Mary Magdalene (see Noli me tangere). The second section describes Jesus' appearances to his disciples, while the final two verses relate why the author wrote this gospel. The first section can also be subdivided between the examination of the tomb by Peter and the Beloved Disciple and Christ's appearance to Mary.

There are several inconsistencies both within the chapter and between it and the resurrection account in the other gospels. Brown has advanced the thesis that the work is a melding of two different sources. One source originally contained verses 1 and 11 to 18 and described Mary Magdalene's trip the tomb. This information is unique to John. Another had verses 3 to 10 and 19 to the end and dealt with the disciples. This portion is far more similar to the synoptic gospels, suggesting that this is merely the synoptics rewritten to make it seem like it was an eyewitness account. The portion on Mary Magdalene, by contrast, had to have been based on sources that only John had access to.

Theologian C. H. Dodd states  that the crucifixion is the climax of John's narrative and argues that this chapter is written as the dénouement and conclusion. Some scholars argue that John 21 seems out of place and that John 20 was the original final chapter of the work. However, ancient manuscripts that contain the end of John 20 also contain text from John 21, so there is no conclusive manuscript evidence for this theory. See John 21 for a more extensive discussion.

Verses

References

Further reading
Barrett, C.K. The Gospel According to John, 2nd Edition. London:SPCK, 1978.
Brown, Raymond E. "The Gospel According to John: XIII-XXI" The Anchor Bible Series Volume 29A New York: Doubleday & Company, 1970.
Bruce, F.F. The Gospel According to John. Grand Rapids: William B. Eerdmans Publishing Company, 1983.
Leonard, W. "St. John." A Catholic Commentary on the Bible. D.B. Orchard ed. New York: Thomas Nelson & Sons, 1953.
Rudolf Schnackenberg. The Gospel According to St. John: Volume III. Crossroad, 1990.
Westcott, B.F The Gospel of St. John. London: John Murray, 1889.

External links
 King James Bible - Wikisource
English Translation with Parallel Latin Vulgate
Online Bible at GospelHall.org (ESV, KJV, Darby, American Standard Version, Bible in Basic English)
Multiple bible versions at Bible Gateway (NKJV, NIV, NRSV etc.)

 
John 20
Empty tomb
Post-resurrection appearances of Jesus
Mary Magdalene